Rósa Ingólfsdóttir (5 August 1947 – 14 January 2020) was an Icelandic actress.

Biography
Rósa is the daughter of Ingólfur Sveinsson and Klara Halldórsdóttir, the youngest of three siblings. She graduated from the Icelandic School of Drama and Arts and Crafts and was the first artist of State and worked for the Icelandic National Broadcasting Service for many years.

Her biography, Rósumál: Líf og störf Rósu Ingólfsdóttur''', was written in 1992 by journalist Jónína Leósdóttir.

DiscographyRosa (1972)

FilmographyMessage to Sandra (1983)Áramótaskaupið 1990 (1990)Real Story 7:15 (1991)Wallpaper: An Erotic Story (1992)In the twilight II'' (1994)

References

External links

1947 births
Rosa Ingolfsdottir
2020 deaths
Rosa Ingolfsdottir
Place of birth missing